The Santa Margarita Formation is a Neogene Period  geologic formation in the San Joaquin Valley of central California.

It preserves fossils dating back to the Miocene epoch.

See also

 List of fossiliferous stratigraphic units in California
 Paleontology in California
 Fossils of Los Angeles

References

External links 
 
 

Geologic formations of California
Miocene California
Phosphorite formations
Geography of the San Joaquin Valley
Geology of Kern County, California